Goniodoris nodosa is a species of sea slug, a dorid nudibranch, a marine gastropod mollusc in the family Goniodorididae.

Distribution
This species was first described from Devon. It has subsequently been reported widely in Britain and Ireland where it is common from the lower shore to moderate depths.

Description
This goniodorid nudibranch is translucent white in colour, with spots of white and yellow. It can reach 27mm in length. Its mantle is reduced and shows its foot.

Ecology
Goniodoris nodosa feeds on bryozoans of the genus Alcyonidium, including Alcyonidium diaphanum, and, when fully grown, the tunicate Dendrodoa grossularia and Botryllus schlosseri, family Styelidae.

References

 Alder J. & Hancock A., 1845: Notice of a new genus and several new species of nudibranchiate Mollusca. Annals and Magazine of Natural History 16: 311-316 
 Gofas, S.; Le Renard, J.; Bouchet, P. (2001). Mollusca. in: Costello, M.J. et al. (Ed.) (2001). European register of marine species: a check-list of the marine species in Europe and a bibliography of guides to their identification. Collection Patrimoines Naturels. 50: pp. 180–213

Goniodorididae
Gastropods described in 1808